Caprock or cap rock is a more resistant rock type overlying a less resistant rock type, analogous to an upper crust on a cake that is harder than the underlying layer.

Description 
The Niagara Escarpment, over which Niagara Falls flows, is an example of a scarp or escarpment. At Niagara Falls, the caprock is the riverbed above the falls, and is what prevents the river from eroding the face of the falls very quickly. In the photo, the dark thin layer in the foreground where water is not yet running, is the caprock. The Niagara caprock is made of dolomitic limestone. Other common types of caprock are sandstone and mafic rock.

In processes such as scarp retreat, the caprock controls the rate of erosion of the scarp.  As the softer rock is cut away, periodically the caprock shears off. Caprock is also found in salt domes and on the top of mesa formations.

Petroleum 
In the petroleum industry, caprock is any nonpermeable formation that may trap oil, gas or water, preventing it from migrating to the surface. This caprock can prevent hydrocarbons from migrating to the surface, allowing them to accumulatie in a reservoir of oil, gas and water. These sturctures also known as petroleum trap are a primary target for the petroleum industry.

Salt dome caprock 

The tops of salt domes such as in the Gulf of Mexico dissolve in a characteristic manner, and can range between 0–1500 ft thick.  The halite (salt) is removed first, leaving behind gypsum and anhydrite.  The anhydrite and gypsum react with organic material to form calcite.  The classic Murray 1966 paper describes the generalized sequence as sediments-calcite-gypsum-anhydrite-salt.

See also 
 Caprock Canyons State Park and Trailway
 Caprock Escarpment
 Hoodoo (geology)
 Monadnock

References 

Stratigraphy